André L. Delbecq was Thomas A. and Kathleen L. McCarthy University Professor at Leavey School of Business, Santa Clara University, in Santa Clara, California. He was the Eighth Dean of Fellows of the Academy of Management, President of the Western Academy of Management and Executive Director of the Organization Behavior Teaching Society. He was born in Toledo, Ohio, and died on October 12, 2016.

Delbecq "played a foundational role in developing and shaping the field of Spirituality and Business Leadership".
His legacy was the focus of the 105-page January, 2020, special issue of the Journal of Management, Spirituality & Religion.

References

External links
Faculty page for André Delbecq (Santa Clara University)
André Delbecq as the Fellow of Dominican School of Philosophy and Theology in Berkeley

Santa Clara University School of Business faculty
1936 births
2016 deaths